Tabernacle Methodist Church is a historic church near Hazlehurst, Mississippi.

It was built in 1857 as the tabernacle of a camp meeting and was added to the National Register in 1996. The church is now owned and maintained by the Tabernacle Methodist Church Cemetery Association.

References

Methodist churches in Mississippi
Churches on the National Register of Historic Places in Mississippi
Georgian architecture in Mississippi
Churches completed in 1857
19th-century Methodist church buildings in the United States
National Register of Historic Places in Copiah County, Mississippi
1857 establishments in Mississippi
Tabernacles (Methodist)